Lyons Creek is a meltwater stream,  long, flowing northeast along the south side of Taylor Glacier into the west end of Lake Bonney in Taylor Valley, Victoria Land, Antarctica. It was named by  the Advisory Committee on Antarctic Names in 1996 after geologist William Berry Lyons, of the University of Alabama, who studied the geochemistry and paleolimnology of the streams and lakes of the McMurdo Dry Valleys from 1985.

References

Rivers of Victoria Land
McMurdo Dry Valleys